The Florida Scholastic Press Association (FSPA) is a not-for-profit organization founded in 1946. It is the scholastic press association for the state of Florida and its members consist of more than 300 student publications, online media teams and broadcast programs from the state. The main mission of the organization is to educate, train and support scholastic journalists and their advisers.  

Currently, Melissa Falkowski is the District 7 workshop coordinator for the 2011–2012 school year.

External links
FSPA Website

Organizations based in Florida
American journalism organizations
1946 establishments in Florida